Astier Nicolas (born 19 January 1989) is a French equestrian. He represented his country at the 2016 Summer Olympics, where he won the gold medal in the team eventing and the silver in the individual eventing.

Biography
Astier Nicolas started horse riding at the age of 7, under the guidance of his mother. Three years later, he started the Pony competitions, becoming a member of the France team pony competition, at the age of 15. He won several awards with Java Bleu La Bree. The awards continued in the junior category and then Young riders, in 2009 he became vice-champion of eventing young riders of Europe.

Astier's first senior championships were 2013 European Eventing Championships. At the competition held in Malmö, Sweden, Astier won a team bronze and placed 24th in the individual portion. In 2015, Astier took victory in the prestigious Les Etoiles de Pau 4* event.

CCI 5* Results

International Championship Results

Notable Horses 

 Java Bleue La Bree - 1997 Chestnut Pony Mare (La Bree Eros x Trefaes Bach)
 2005 European Pony Championships - Team Seventh Place, Individual Sixth Place
 Jhakti du Janlie - 1997 Bay Selle Francais Gelding (Bhakti de Beaupre x Question Mark)
 2006 European Junior Championships - Team Bronze Medal, Individual Eighth Place
 2007 European Junior Championships - Team Bronze Medal, Individual Fifth Place
 2008 European Young Rider Championships - Team Sixth Place, Individual Tenth Place
 2009 European Young Rider Championships - Team Fifth Place, Individual Silver Medal
 Piaf de B'Neville - 2003 Bay Selle Francais Gelding (Caprice D'Elle II x Reve D'Elle)
 2013 European Championships - Team Bronze Medal, Individual 24th Place
 2015 Pau CCI**** Winner
 2016 Rio Olympics - Team Gold Medal, Individual Silver Medal
 Vinci de la Vinge - 2009 Bay Selle Francais Gelding (Esterel Des Bois SF x Duc du Hutrel)
 2016 FEI Eventing Young Horse World Championships - Fifth Place
2018 World Equestrian Games - Seventh Place Individual
 Alertamalib'or - 2010 Bay Anglo-Arabian Gelding (Yarlands Summer Song x Prince Ig'or)
 2017 FEI Eventing Young Horse World Championships - Gold Medal

References

External links
 
 
 
 

1989 births
Living people
Sportspeople from Toulouse
French male equestrians
Equestrians at the 2016 Summer Olympics
Olympic equestrians of France
Olympic gold medalists for France
Olympic silver medalists for France
Olympic medalists in equestrian
Medalists at the 2016 Summer Olympics